Greenway, also referred to as New Inn, is a hamlet on the southern slopes of the Preseli Mountains in Pembrokeshire, Wales. It sits on the crossroads between the B4329 old Cardigan to Haverfordwest turnpike and the B4313 road between Fishguard and Narberth and is the site of a former inn serving travellers on these routes, now a private dwelling. Greenway is in the parish of Morvil and the community of Puncheston, and the nearest village is Rosebush.

The North Pembrokeshire and Fishguard Railway had a halt at Greenway.

Richard Fenton described New Inn in his 1811 Historical Tour through Pembrokeshire –

References

Villages in Pembrokeshire